Liliana Campos (born 27 April 1971) is a Portuguese television presenter and fashion model. She has a degree in international relations, and started her professional career at SIC television in Portugal.

She is married to Rodrigo Herédia.

Among SIC's television shows she participated are O Juiz Decide, Mundo VIP, Campeões Nacionais, Flash, Êxtase, Animais de Quatro Patas and Fama Show.

References

External links
 

Portuguese female models
Portuguese television presenters
Living people
1971 births
Portuguese women television presenters